Capezzone may refer to:

 Daniele Capezzone (born 1972), Italian journalist and former politician
 Monte Capezzone, mountain in the Pennine Alps of north-western Italy